Luca Cantagalli (born 11 August 1965 in Cavriago) is an Italian  volleyball former player who was twice World champion with his national team in 1990 and 1994. He was nicknamed "bazooka" by the fans, due to his powerful spikes. He competed at three Olympic Games, winning a silver medal at the 1996 Summer Olympics in Atlanta.

Career
Debuting on 18 March 1986, he totalled 330 caps for Italy men's national volleyball team. He was four times Italian champion and three times European Champion (1989, 1993 and 1995).

After announcing his retire at the end of the 2005-2006 season, he played shortly for the team of his native Cavriago in the A2 series of Italy. Cantagalli retired in 2007.

Clubs

References

External links
Personal data

1965 births
Living people
Sportspeople from the Province of Reggio Emilia
Italian men's volleyball players
Olympic silver medalists for Italy
Volleyball players at the 1988 Summer Olympics
Volleyball players at the 1992 Summer Olympics
Volleyball players at the 1996 Summer Olympics
Olympic medalists in volleyball
Medalists at the 1996 Summer Olympics